Boukout (also called bukut or futampaf) is a Jola rite of passage practiced in Ziguinchor, Senegal.

Origin
There is evidence that this ritual has existed at least since the 12th century. Before the colonization, boukout was the only method of formal education in the area, preparing young men to take their place in society as well as teaching them how to defend it.

Issues
Organized by the elders who hold power over the other villagers and control all means of production, the ceremony provides initiates with political, economic, and religious independence. Until they have partaken in boukout, young people may not marry or receive land, and are somewhat excluded from the community. The uninitiated are not considered men, as boukout is seen to bestow masculinity.

Ceremony
The period between ceremonies can be lengthy, often lasting twenty years. When the ceremony took place in Baïla in August 2007, it had been 36 years since boukout had been performed. It is never known precisely when boukout will take place, although the event is announced by the elders two or three years before the fact, after having discovered a series of phenomena that constitute the necessary signs.

Preparations for boukout last several days, as future initiates, relatives, and residents of nearby villages gather in large numbers in the village. Members of the diaspora also take part, so that hundreds or even thousands of people are present. The event is accompanied by masked dances and various demonstrations of bravery. Finally, the heads of future inititiates are shaved.

The actual initiation takes place in private in a sacred wood. At one time, this secluded initiation period lasted several months, but the time has since been shortened significantly.

Known dates
1972 - Seleki
2007 - Baïla
2009 - Kabrousse

See also
Culture of Senegal
Ndut

Bibliography

Filmography
 Tigguy (Guy Garçon), L’appel du Bukut, 52’

External links

 The Boukout School of Knowledge, Life Skills, and Jola Education
 Initiation Ceremony: The Boukout Begins This Saturday in Baïla, 36 Years Later
 Initiation in Baïla: A Piece of History Revisited by Thousands of Young People in Jola Country

Rites of passage
Senegalese culture